The 2016 Sun Belt Conference women's soccer tournament is the postseason women's soccer tournament for the Sun Belt Conference to be held from November 2 to 6, 2016. The seven-match tournament will be held at the Foley Sports Complex in Foley, Alabama. The eight team single-elimination tournament will consist of three rounds based on seeding from regular season conference play. The South Alabama Jaguars are the defending tournament champions after defeating the Georgia State Panthers in the championship match.

Bracket

Schedule

Quarterfinals

Semifinals

Final

References 
2016 Sun Belt Soccer Championship

Sun Belt Conference Women's Soccer Tournament
2016 Sun Belt Conference women's soccer season
Women's sports in Alabama